The West Dublin Rhinos are an American Football team playing in Castleknock College in Dublin. They currently play in the Irish American Football League. When the Rhinos made their debut in the league, they were called the Dublin Rhinos. Beginning with the 2009 season, they were renamed the West Dublin Rhinos.

External links 
 IAFL official website
 

2008 establishments in Ireland
American football teams in County Dublin
American football teams established in 2008
Sports clubs in Dublin (city)